In the textual criticism of the New Testament, the Byzantine text-type (also called Majority Text, Traditional Text, Ecclesiastical Text, Constantinopolitan Text, Antiocheian Text, or Syrian Text) is one of the main text types. It is the form found in the largest number of surviving manuscripts of the Greek New Testament. The New Testament text of the Eastern Orthodox Church, the Patriarchal Text, as well as those utilized in the lectionaries, are based on this text-type. Whilst varying in at least 1,830 places, it also underlies the Textus Receptus Greek text used for most Reformation-era (Protestant) translations of the New Testament into vernacular languages. Modern translations (since 1900) mainly use eclectic editions that conform more often to the Alexandrian text-type.

The Byzantine text is also found in a few modern Eastern Orthodox editions, as the Byzantine textual tradition has continued in the Eastern Orthodox Church into the present time. The text used by the Orthodox Church is supported by late minuscule manuscripts. It is commonly accepted as the standard Byzantine text.

Manuscripts 

The earliest undisputed Church Father to witness to a Byzantine text-type in substantial New Testament quotations is John Chrysostom (c. 349 – 407); although the fragmentary surviving works of Asterius the Sophist († 341) have also been considered to conform to the Byzantine text, though the version of the Gospel of Matthew used by Basil the Great (c. 330 – 379) has been argued to be an earlier substantial witness to the Byzantine text type. The incomplete surviving translation of Wulfila (d. 383) into Gothic is often thought to derive from the Byzantine text type or an intermediary between the Byzantine and Western text types. Chrysostom and Asterius used a text only 75% in agreement with the standard Byzantine text. The second earliest translation to witness to a Greek base conforming generally to the Byzantine text in the Gospels is the Syriac Peshitta (though it has many Alexandrian and Western readings); usually dated to the beginning of the 5th century; although in respect of several much contested readings, such as Mark 1:2 and John 1:18, the Peshitta rather supports the Alexandrian witnesses. Dating from the fourth century, and hence possibly earlier than the Peshitta, is the Ethiopic version of the Gospels; best represented by the surviving fifth and sixth century manuscripts of the Garima Gospels and classified by Rochus Zuurmond as "early Byzantine". Zuurmond notes that, especially in the Gospel of John, the form of the early Byzantine text found in the Ethiopic Gospels is quite different from the later Greek Majority Text, and agrees in a number of places with Papyrus 66.

Notable manuscripts

Other manuscripts 

 Papyri

 Uncials

Codex Mutinensis (H), Codex Cyprius (K), Codex Mosquensis I (K), Campianus (M), Petropolitanus Purp. (N), Sinopensis (O), Guelferbytanus A (P), Guelferbytanus B (Q), Nitriensis (R), Nanianus (U), Monacensis (X), Tischendorfianus IV (Γ), Sangallensis (Δ) (except Mark), Tischendorfianus III (Λ), Petropolitanus (Π), Rossanensis (Σ), Beratinus (Φ), Dionysiou (Ω), Vaticanus 2066 (Uncial 046), Uncial 047, 049, 052, 053, 054, 056, 061, 063, 064, 065, 069 (?), 093 (Acts), 0103, 0104, 0105, 0116, 0120, 0133, 0134, 0135, 0136, 0142, 0151, 0197, 0211, 0246, 0248, 0253, 0255, 0257, 0265, 0269 (mixed), 0272, 0273 (?).

 Minuscules

More than 80% of minuscules represent the Byzantine text.

2, 3, 6 (Gospels and Acts), 8, 9, 11, 12, 14, 15, 18, 21, 23, 24, 25, 27, 28 (except Mark), 29, 30, 32, 34, 35, 36, 37, 39, 40, 42, 44, 45, 46, 47, 49, 50, 52, 53, 54, 55, 57, 58, 60, 61 (Gospels and Acts), 63, 65, 66, 68, 69 (except Paul), 70, 73, 74, 75, 76, 77, 78, 80, 82, 83, 84, 89, 90, 92, 93, 95, 97, 98, 99, 100, 103, 104 (except Paul), 105, 107, 108, 109, 110, 111, 112, 116, 119, 120, 121, 122, 123, 125, 126, 127, 128, 129, 132, 133, 134, 135, 136, 137, 138, 139, 140, 141, 142, 143, 144, 146, 147, 148, 149, 150, 151, 155, 156, 159, 162, 167, 169, 170, 171, 177, 180 (except Acts), 181 (only Rev.), 182, 183, 185, 186, 187, 189, 190, 192, 193, 194, 195, 196, 197, 198, 199, 200, 201, 202, 203, 204, 205 (Epistles), 206 (except Cath.), 207, 208, 209 (except Gospels and Rev.), 210, 212, 214, 215, 217, 218 (except Cath. and Paul), 219, 220, 221, 223, 224, 226, 227, 231, 232, 235, 236, 237, 240, 243, 244, 245, 246, 247, 248, 250, 254 (except Cath.), 256 (except Paul), 259, 260, 261, 262, 263 (except Paul), 264, 266, 267, 268, 269, 270, 272, 275, 276, 277, 278a, 278b, 280, 281, 282, 283, 284, 285, 286, 287, 288, 289, 290, 291, 292, 293, 297, 300, 301, 302, 303, 304, 305, 306, 308, 309, 313, 314, 316, 319, 320, 324, 325, 327, 328, 329, 330 (except Paul), 331, 334, 335, 337, 342, 343, 344, 347, 350, 351, 352, 353, 354, 355, 356, 357, 358, 359, 360, 361, 362, 364, 365 (except Paul), 366, 367, 368, 369, 371, 373, 374, 375, 376, 378 (except Cath.), 379, 380, 381, 384, 385, 386, 387, 388, 390, 392, 393, 394, 395, 396, 398 (except Cath.), 399, 401, 402, 404, 405, 407, 408, 409, 410, 411, 412, 413, 414, 415, 417, 418, 419, 422, 425, 426, 429 (Paul and Rev.), 431 (except Acts and Cath.), 432, 438, 439, 443, 445, 446, 448, 449, 450, 451 (except Paul), 452, 454, 457, 458, 459 (except Paul), 461, 465, 466, 469, 470, 471, 473, 474, 475, 476, 477, 478, 479, 480, 481, 482, 483, 484, 485, 490, 491, 492, 493, 494, 496, 497, 498, 499, 500, 501, 502, 504, 505, 506, 507, 509, 510, 511, 512, 514, 516, 518, 519, 520, 521, 522 (except Acts and Cath.), 523, 524, 525, 526, 527, 528, 529, 530, 531, 532, 533, 534, 535, 538, 540, 541, 546, 547, 548, 549, 550, 551, 553, 554, 556, 558, 559, 560, 564, 568, 570, 571, 573, 574, 575, 577, 578, 580, 583, 584, 585, 586, 587, 588, 592, 593, 594, 596, 597, 600, 601, 602, 603, 604, 605, 607, 610 (in Cath.), 614 (in Cath.), 616, 618, 620, 622, 624, 625, 626, 627, 628, 632, 633, 634, 637, 638, 639, 640, 642 (except Cath.), 644, 645, 648, 649, 650, 651, 655, 656, 657, 660, 662, 663, 664, 666, 668, 669, 672, 673, 674, 677, 680, 684, 685, 686, 688, 689, 690, 691, 692, 694, 696, 698, 699, 705, 707, 708, 711, 714, 715, 717, 718, 721, 724, 725, 727, 729, 730, 731, 734, 736, 737, 739, 741, 745, 746, 748, 750, 754, 755, 756, 757, 758, 759, 760, 761, 762, 763, 764, 765, 768, 769, 770, 773, 774, 775, 777, 778, 779, 781, 782, 783, 784, 785, 786, 787, 789, 790, 793, 794, 797, 798, 799, 801, 802, 806, 808, 809, 811, 818, 819, 820, 824, 825, 830, 831, 833, 834, 835, 836, 839, 840, 841, 843, 844, 845, 846, 848, 852, 853, 857, 858, 860, 861, 862, 864, 866, 867, 868, 870, 877, 880, 884, 886, 887, 889, 890, 893, 894, 896, 897, 898, 900, 901, 902, 904, 905, 906, 910, 911, 912, 914, 916, 917 (Paul), 918 (Paul), 919, 920, 921, 922, 924, 928, 936, 937, 938, 942, 943, 944, 945 (Acts and Cath.), 950, 951, 952, 953, 955, 956, 957, 958, 959, 960, 961, 962, 963, 964, 965, 966, 967, 969, 970, 971, 973, 975, 977, 978, 980, 981, 987, 988, 991, 993, 994, 995, 997, 998, 999, 1000, 1003, 1004, 1006 (Gospels), 1007, 1008, 1010 (?), 1011, 1013, 1014, 1015, 1016, 1017, 1018, 1019, 1020, 1023, 1024, 1025, 1026, 1028, 1030, 1031, 1032, 1033, 1036, 1044, 1045, 1046, 1050, 1052, 1053, 1054, 1055, 1056, 1057, 1059, 1060, 1061, 1062, 1063, 1065, 1067 (except Cath.), 1068, 1069, 1070, 1072, 1073, 1074, 1075, 1076, 1077, 1078, 1080, 1081, 1083, 1085, 1087, 1088, 1089, 1094, 1099, 1100, 1101, 1103, 1104, 1105, 1107, 1110, 1112, 1119, 1121, 1123, 1129, 1148, 1149, 1150, 1161, 1168, 1169, 1171, 1172, 1173, 1174, 1176, 1177, 1185, 1186, 1187, 1188, 1189, 1190, 1191, 1193, 1196, 1197, 1198, 1199, 1200, 1201, 1202, 1203, 1205, 1206, 1207, 1208, 1209, 1211, 1212, 1213, 1214, 1215, 1217, 1218, 1220, 1221, 1222, 1223, 1224, 1225, 1226, 1227, 1231, 1241 (only Acts), 1251 (?), 1252, 1254, 1255, 1260, 1264, 1277, 1283, 1285, 1292 (except Cath.), 1296, 1297, 1298, 1299, 1300, 1301, 1303, 1305, 1309, 1310, 1312, 1313, 1314, 1315, 1316, 1317, 1318, 1319 (except Paul), 1320, 1323, 1324, 1328, 1330, 1331, 1334, 1339, 1340, 1341, 1343, 1345, 1347, 1350a, 1350b, 1351, 1352a, 1354, 1355, 1356, 1357, 1358, 1359 (except Cath.), 1360, 1362, 1364, 1367, 1370, 1373, 1374, 1377, 1384, 1385, 1392, 1395, 1398 (except Paul), 1400, 1409 (Gospels and Paul), 1417, 1437, 1438, 1444, 1445, 1447, 1448 (except Cath.), 1449, 1452, 1470, 1476, 1482, 1483, 1492, 1503, 1504, 1506 (Gospels), 1508, 1513, 1514, 1516, 1517, 1520, 1521, 1523 (Paul), 1539, 1540, 1542b (only Luke), 1543, 1545, 1547, 1548, 1556, 1566, 1570, 1572, 1573 (except Paul?), 1577, 1583, 1594, 1597, 1604, 1605, 1607, 1613, 1614, 1617, 1618, 1619, 1622, 1628, 1636, 1637, 1649, 1656, 1662, 1668, 1672, 1673, 1683, 1693, 1701, 1704 (except Acts), 1714, 1717, 1720, 1723, 1725, 1726, 1727, 1728, 1730, 1731, 1732, 1733, 1734, 1736, 1737, 1738, 1740, 1741, 1742, 1743, 1745, 1746, 1747, 1748, 1749, 1750, 1752, 1754, 1755a, 1755b, 1756, 1757, 1759, 1761, 1762, 1763, 1767, 1768, 1770, 1771, 1772, 1800, 1821, 1826, 1828, 1829, 1835, 1841 (except Rev.), 1846 (only Acts), 1847, 1849, 1851, 1852 (only in Rev.), 1854 (except Rev.), 1855, 1856, 1858, 1859, 1860, 1861, 1862, 1869, 1870, 1872, 1874 (except Paul), 1876, 1877 (except Paul), 1878, 1879, 1880, 1882, 1883, 1888, 1889, 1891 (except Acts), 1897, 1899, 1902, 1905, 1906, 1907, 1911, 1914, 1915, 1916, 1917, 1918, 1919, 1920, 1921, 1922, 1923, 1924, 1925, 1926, 1927, 1928, 1929, 1930, 1931, 1932, 1933, 1934, 1936,1937, 1938, 1941, 1946, 1948, 1951, 1952, 1954, 1955, 1956, 1957, 1958, 1964, 1970, 1971, 1972, 1974, 1975, 1978, 1979, 1980, 1981, 1982, 1986, 1988, 1992, 1997, 1998, 2001, 2003, 2007, 2009, 2013, 2048, 2096, 2098, 2111, 2119, 2125, 2126, 2127 (except Paul), 2132, 2133, 2135, 2138 (only in Rev.), 2139, 2140, 2141, 2142, 2144, 2160, 2172, 2173, 2175, 2176, 2177, 2178, 2181, 2183, 2187, 2189, 2191, 2199, 2218, 2221, 2236, 2261, 2266, 2267, 2273, 2275, 2277, 2281, 2289, 2295, 2300, 2303, 2306, 2307, 2309, 2310, 2311, 2352, 2355, 2356, 2373, 2376, 2378, 2381, 2382, 2386, 2389, 2390, 2406, 2407, 2409, 2414, 2415, 2418, 2420, 2422, 2423, 2424, 2425, 2426, 2430, 2431, 2437, 2441, 2442, 2445, 2447, 2450, 2451, 2452, 2454, 2455, 2457, 2458, 2459, 2466, 2468, 2475, 2479, 2483, 2484, 2490, 2491, 2496, 2497, 2499, 2500, 2501, 2502, 2503, 2507, 2532, 2534, 2536, 2539, 2540, 2545, 2547, 2549, 2550, 2552, 2554, 2555, 2558, 2559, 2562, 2563, 2567, 2571, 2572, 2573, 2578, 2579, 2581, 2584, 2587, 2593, 2600, 2619, 2624, 2626, 2627, 2629, 2631, 2633, 2634, 2635, 2636, 2637, 2639, 2645, 2646, 2649, 2650, 2651, 2653, 2656, 2657, 2658, 2660, 2661, 2665, 2666, 2671, 2673, 2675, 2679, 2690, 2691, 2696, 2698, 2699, 2700, 2704, 2711, 2712, 2716, 2721, 2722, 2723, 2724, 2725, 2727, 2729, 2746, 2760, 2761, 2765, 2767, 2773, 2774, 2775, 2779, 2780, 2781, 2782, 2783, 2784, 2785, 2787, 2790, 2791, 2794, 2815, 2817, 2829.

Distribution by century 

 9th century

461, 1080, 1862, 2142, 2500

 9th/10th

399

 10th

14, 27, 29, 34, 36e, 63, 82, 92, 100, 135, 144, 151, 221, 237, 262, 278b, 344, 364, 371, 405, 411, 450, 454, 457, 478, 481, 564, 568, 584, 602, 605, 626, 627, 669, 920, 1055, 1076, 1077, 1078, 1203, 1220, 1223, 1225, 1347, 1351, 1357, 1392, 1417, 1452, 1661, 1720, 1756, 1829, 1851, 1880, 1905, 1920, 1927, 1954, 1997, 1998, 2125, 2373, 2414, 2545, 2722, 2790

 10th/11th

994, 1073, 1701

 11th

7p, 8, 12, 20, 23, 24, 25, 37, 39, 40, 50, 65, 68, 75, 77, 83, 89, 98, 108, 112, 123, 125, 126, 127, 133, 137, 142, 143, 148, 150, 177, 186, 194, 195, 197, 200, 207, 208, 210, 212, 215, 236, 250, 259, 272, 276, 277, 278a, 300, 301, 302, 314, 325, 331, 343, 350, 352, 354, 357, 360, 375, 376, 422, 458, 465, 466, 470, 474, 475, 476, 490, 491, 497, 504, 506, 507, 516, 526, 527, 528, 530, 532, 547, 548, 549, 560, 583, 585, 596, 607, 624, 625, 638, 639, 640, 651, 672, 699, 707, 708, 711, 717, 746, 754, 756, 773, 785, 809, 831, 870, 884, 887, 894, 901, 910, 919, 937, 942, 943, 944, 964, 965, 991, 1014, 1028, 1045, 1054, 1056, 1074, 1110, 1123, 1168, 1174, 1187, 1207, 1209, 1211, 1212, 1214, 1221, 1222, 1244, 1277, 1300, 1312, 1314, 1317, 1320, 1324, 1340, 1343, 1373, 1384, 1438, 1444, 1449, 1470, 1483, 1513, 1514, 1517, 1520, 1521, 1545, 1556, 1570, 1607, 1668, 1672, 1693, 1730, 1734, 1738, 1770, 1828, 1835, 1847, 1849, 1870, 1878, 1879, 1888, 1906, 1907, 1916, 1919, 1921, 1923, 1924, 1925, 1932, 1933, 1934, 1946, 1955, 1980, 1981, 1982, 2001, 2007, 2098, 2132, 2133, 2144, 2172, 2176, 2181, 2183, 2199, 2275, 2277, 2281, 2386, 2295, 2307, 2381, 2386, 2430, 2442, 2447, 2451, 2458, 2468, 2475, 2539, 2547, 2559, 2563, 2567, 2571, 2587, 2637, 2649, 2661, 2723, 2746, 2760, 2782, 2787 
2306 (composite of parts from the 11th to the 14th centuries)

 11th/12th

665, 657, 660, 1013, 1188, 1191, 1309, 1358, 1340, 1566, 2389, 2415, 2784

 12th

2e, 2ap, 3, 9, 11, 15, 21, 32, 44, 46, 49, 57, 73, 76, 78, 80, 84, 95, 97, 105, 110, 111, 116, 119, 120, 122, 129, 132, 134, 138, 139, 140, 146, 156, 159, 162, 183, 187, 193, 196, 199, 202, 203, 217, 224, 226, 231, 240, 244, 245, 247, 261, 264, 267, 268, 269, 270, 275, 280, 281, 282, 297, 304, 306, 319, 320, 329, 334, 337, 347, 351, 353, 355, 356, 366, 374, 387, 392, 395, 396, 401, 407, 408, 419, 438, 439, 443, 452, 471, 485, 499, 502, 505, 509, 510, 514, 518, 520, 524, 529, 531, 535, 538, 550, 551, 556, 570, 571, 580, 587, 618, 620, 622, 637, 650, 662, 673, 674, 688, 692, 721, 736, 748, 750, 760, 765, 768, 770, 774, 777, 778, 779, 782, 787, 793, 799, 808, 843, 857, 860, 862, 877, 893, 896, 902, 911, 916, 922, 924, 936, 950, 967, 971, 973, 975, 980, 987, 993, 998, 1007, 1046, 1081, 1083, 1085, 1112, 1169, 1176, 1186, 1190, 1193, 1197, 1198, 1199, 1200, 1217, 1218, 1224, 1231, 1240, 1301, 1315, 1316, 1318, 1323, 1350a, 1355, 1360, 1364, 1375, 1385, 1437, 1539, 1583, 1673, 1683, 1714, 1737, 1752, 1754, 1755a, 1755b, 1800, 1821, 1826, 1872, 1889, 1914, 1915, 1917, 1926, 1951, 1970, 1971, 1974, 1986, 1988, 2013, 2096, 2126, 2135, 2139, 2173, 2177, 2189, 2191, 2289, 2282, 2426, 2437, 2445, 2459, 2490, 2491, 2507, 2536, 2549, 2550, 2552, 2562, 2639, 2650, 2657, 2671, 2700, 2712, 2725, 2727, 2781, 2785, 2791, 2794 
632 and 1227 (composites of parts from the 12th to the 14th centuries)

 12th/13th

905, 906, 1310, 1341, 1897, 2311

 13th

52, 55, 60, 74, 107, 121, 128, 136, 141, 147, 167, 170, 192, 198, 204, 219, 220, 227, 248, 260, 284, 291, 292, 293, 303, 305, 309, 327, 328, 342, 359, 361, 362, 384, 388, 390, 410, 449, 469, 473, 477, 479, 482, 483, 484, 496, 500, 501, 511, 519, 533, 534, 546, 553, 554, 558, 573, 574, 592, 593, 597, 601, 663, 666, 677, 684, 685, 689, 691, 696, 705, 714, 715, 725, 729, 737, 757, 759, 775, 811, 820, 825, 830, 835, 840, 897, 898, 900, 912, 914, 966, 969, 970, 981, 995, 997, 999, 1000, 1004, 1008, 1011, 1015, 1016, 1031, 1050, 1052, 1053, 1057, 1069, 1070, 1072, 1087, 1089, 1094, 1103, 1107, 1129, 1148, 1149, 1150, 1161, 1177, 1201, 1205, 1206, 1208, 1213, 1215, 1226, 1238, 1255, 1285, 1339, 1352a, 1400, 1594, 1597, 1604, 1622, 1717, 1717, 1728, 1731, 1736, 1740, 1742, 1772, 1855, 1858, 1922, 1938, 1941, 1956, 1972, 1992, 2111, 2119, 2140, 2141, 2236, 2353, 2376, 2380, 2390, 2409, 2420, 2423, 2425, 2457, 2479, 2483, 2502, 2534, 2540, 2558, 2568, 2584, 2600, 2624, 2627, 2631, 2633, 2645, 2646, 2658, 2660, 2665, 2670, 2696, 2699, 2724, 2761

 13th/14th

266, 656, 668, 1334, 2499, 2578

 14th

18, 45, 53, 54, 66, 109, 155, 171, 182, 185, 190, 201, 214, 223, 232, 235, 243, 246, 290, 308, 316, 324, 358, 367, 369, 381, 386, 393, 394, 402, 404, 409, 412, 413, 414, 415, 417, 425, 426, 480, 492, 494, 498, 512, 521, 523, 540, 577, 578, 586, 588, 594, 600, 603, 604, 628, 633, 634, 644, 645, 648, 649, 680, 686, 690, 698, 718, 727, 730, 731, 734, 741, 758, 761, 762, 763, 764, 769, 781, 783, 784, 786, 789, 790, 794, 797, 798, 802, 806, 818, 819, 824, 833, 834, 836, 839, 845, 846, 848, 858, 864, 866a, 867, 889, 890, 904, 921, 928, 938, 951, 952, 953, 959, 960, 977, 978, 1020, 1023, 1032, 1033, 1036, 1061, 1062, 1075, 1099, 1100, 1119, 1121, 1185, 1189, 1196, 1234, 1235, 1236, 1248, 1249, 1252, 1254, 1283, 1328, 1330, 1331, 1345, 1350b, 1356, 1377, 1395, 1445, 1447, 1476, 1492, 1503, 1504, 1516, 1543, 1547, 1548, 1572, 1577, 1605, 1613, 1614, 1619, 1637, 1723, 1725, 1726, 1732, 1733, 1741, 1746, 1747, 1761, 1762, 1771, 1856, 1859, 1899, 1902, 1918, 1928, 1929, 1952, 1975, 2085, 2160, 2261, 2266, 2273, 2303, 2309, 2310, 2355, 2356, 2406, 2407, 2431, 2441, 2454, 2466, 2484, 2503, 2593, 2626, 2629, 2634, 2651, 2653, 2666, 2668, 2679, 2698, 2716, 2765, 2767, 2773, 2774, 2775, 2780, 2783

 15th

30, 47, 58, 70, 149, 285, 286, 287, 288, 313, 368, 373, 379, 380, 385, 418, 432, 446, 448, 493, 525, 541, 575, 616, 664, 694, 739, 801, 841, 844, 853, 880, 955, 958, 961, 962, 1003, 1017, 1018, 1024, 1026, 1059, 1060, 1105, 1202, 1232, 1233, 1247, 1250, 1260, 1264, 1482, 1508, 1617, 1626, 1628, 1636, 1649, 1656, 1745, 1750, 1757, 1763, 1767, 1876, 1882, 1948, 1957, 1958, 1964, 1978, 2003, 2175, 2178, 2221, 2352, 2418, 2452, 2455, 2554, 2673, 2675, 2691, 2704, 2729

 15th/16th

99, 1367

 16th

90, 335, 445, 724, 745, 755, 867, 957, 1019, 1030, 1065, 1068, 1088, 1239, 1362, 1370, 1374, 1618, 1749, 1768, 1861, 1883, 1911, 1930, 1931, 1936, 1937, 1979, 2009, 2218, 2378, 2422, 2496, 2501, 2532, 2555, 2572, 2573, 2579, 2635, 2636, 2690, 2711, 2721, 2779

 16th/17th

1371

 17th and later

289, 868, 956, 963, 988, 1044, 1063, 1101, 1104, 1303, 1748, 1869, 2267, 2450, 2497, 2581, 2619, 2656.

Characteristics 

Compared to Alexandrian text-type manuscripts, the distinct Byzantine readings tend to show a greater tendency toward smooth and well-formed Greek, they display fewer instances of textual variation between parallel Synoptic Gospel passages, and they are less likely to present contradictory or "difficult" issues of exegesis.

Textus Receptus 

The first printed edition of the Greek New Testament was completed by Erasmus and published by Johann Froben of Basel on March 1, 1516 (Novum Instrumentum omne). Due to the pressure of his publisher to bring their edition to market before the competing Complutensian Polyglot, Erasmus based his work on around a half-dozen manuscripts, all of which dated from the twelfth century or later; and all but one were of the Byzantine text-type. Six verses that were not witnessed in any of these sources, he back-translated from the Latin Vulgate, and Erasmus also introduced many readings from the Vulgate and Church Fathers. This text came to be known as the Textus Receptus or received text after being thus termed by Bonaventura Elzevir, an enterprising publisher from the Netherlands, in his 1633 edition of Erasmus' text. The New Testament of the King James Version of the Bible was translated from editions of what was to become the Textus Receptus. The different Byzantine "Majority Text" of Hodges & Farstad as well as Robinson & Pierpont is called "Majority" because it is considered to be the Greek text established on the basis of the reading found in the vast majority of the Greek manuscripts. The Textus Receptus differs from the Majority Text in 1,838 Greek readings, of which 1,005 represent "translatable" differences.

Modern critical texts 
Karl Lachmann was the first New Testament textual critic to produce an edition that broke with the Textus Receptus, ignoring previous printings and basing his text on ancient sources, therefore discounting the mass of late Byzantine manuscripts and the Textus Receptus. The critical Greek New Testament texts of today (represented by UBS/NA Greek New Testaments) are predominantly Alexandrian in nature, but there are some critics such as Robinson and Hodges who still favor the Byzantine Text, and have produced Byzantine-Majority critical editions of the Greek New Testament. Around 6,500 readings differ between the Majority text and the modern critical text (represented by UBS/NA Greek New Testaments), although the two still agree 98% of the time.

The Byzantine type is also found in modern Greek Orthodox editions. A new scholarly edition of the Byzantine Text of John's gospel, (funded by the United Bible Societies in response to a request from Eastern Orthodox Scholars), was begun in Birmingham, UK. and in 2007, as a result of these efforts, The Gospel According to John in the Byzantine Tradition was published.

Von Soden divided manuscripts of the Byzantine text into five groups:
 Kx: no uncials, hundreds of minuscules, among them codex 2, 3, 8, 14, 45, 47, 49, 51, 54, 56, 58, 59, 60, 61, 73, 75, 76, 78, etc.
 Kr: no uncials, no early minuscules, hundreds of minuscules: 18, 35, 55, 66, 83, 128, 141, 147, 155, 167, 170, 189, 201
 K1 (subfamily of Kx): S V Ω 461
 Ki (Family E): E F G H
 Ik (also Ka), now Family Π: (A) K Y Π; this subgroup is the oldest, but only 5% of manuscripts belong to it. Majority of them have text mixed with other Byzantine subfamilies.

Examples:

Luke 10:39
 :   A W Byz b
 :  B D L Ξ 579 892 copbo syrc

Luke 10:42
 :   A C W Byz
 : B
 : 
 : 38 syrpal

Luke 11:33
 :  B F Θ f1 f13
 :  33 Byz

John 10:29
 : B it
 :  f1 f13 Byz

John 11:32
 :  B C* D L X
 :  Θ Byz

John 13:26
 :  B C L X 33
 : c A Θ

Acts 17:13
 :
 omitted:  E Byz

1 Corinthians 9:7
 : * A B D* G P
 :  Byz

Ephesians 5:9
 : * A B D* G P
 :  Byz

Philippians 1:14
 :  A B (D*) P Ψ 33 81 104 326 365 629 1175 1241 2464
 omitted:  D2 Byz

This supports the views of scholars such as Harry Sturz (1984) and Maurice Robinson (2005) that the roots of the Byzantine text may go back to a very early date. (In 1963 Bruce Metzger had argued that early support for Byzantine readings could not be taken to demonstrate that they were in the original text.) Some authors have interpreted this as a rehabilitation of the Textus Receptus. Many of these readings have substantial support from other text-types and they are not distinctively Byzantine. Daniel Wallace found only two agreements distinctively between papyrus and Byzantine readings.

See also

Families of the Byzantine text-type 

 Family Π
 Family E
 Family K1
 Family Kr
 Family Kx
 Families associated with the Byzantine text
 Family 1424
 Family 1739

Other text-types 

 Categories of New Testament manuscripts
 Alexandrian text-type
 Caesarean text-type
 Western text-type
 Textus Receptus

Critical text 

 Novum Testamentum Graece
 Textual Criticism
 Conflation of Readings

Notes

Further reading 

 The New Testament in the Original Greek: Byzantine Textform 2018, edited by Maurice A. Robinson and William G. Pierpont, VTR Publications. .
 The Greek New Testament for Beginning Readers: Byzantine Textform, The Greek Text & Verb Parsing as Compiled by Maurice A. Robinson & William G. Pierpont, Lexical Information & Layout by John Jeffrey Dodson, VTR Publications, 2010. .
 Harry A. Sturz, The Byzantine Text-Type & New Testament Textual Criticism (1984).
 The Greek New Testament According to the Majority Text, Second Edition, edited by Zane C. Hodges and Arthur L. Farstad, Thomas Nelson Publishers, Nashville, 1985. .
 The New Testament in the Original Greek: Byzantine Textform 2005, Edited by Maurice A. Robinson and William G. Pierpont, Chilton Book Publishing. .
 The King James Only Controversy 2009, James R White, Bethany House. .
 "Some Second Thoughts on the Majority Text", Daniel B. Wallace, Bibliotheca Sacra, vol. 146, 1989. 270–290.
 The Identity of the New Testament Text II, Wilbur N. Pickering, http://www.revisedstandard.net/text/WNP/
 What About the Majority Text?, Michael D. Marlowe www.bible-researcher.com
 Bruce M. Metzger, Bart D. Ehrman, The Text of the New Testament: Its Transmission, Corruption and Restoration, 1968 etc., Oxford University Press.
 B. M. Metzger, A Textual Commentary of the Greek New Testament: A Companion Volume to the United Bible Societies' Greek New Testament, 1994, United Bible Societies, London & New York, pp. 7*-9*, 15*-16*.
 M. A. Robinson, "The Case for Byzantine Priority", in: "Rethinking New Testament Textual Criticism", ed. D. A. Black, Baker Academic, Grand Rapids: 2002, pp. 125–139
 Klaus Wachtel, Der Byzantinische Text Der Katholischen Briefe (Universität Münster, 1994).
 "The Byzantine Priority Hypothesis" At the Encyclopedia of Textual Criticism
 The Gospel According to John in the Byzantine Tradition
 Paulo José Benício, O Texto Bizantino na Tradição Manuscrita do Novo Testamento Grego 
 Ernst Boogert, The Origin of the Byzantine Text: New Perspectives in a Deadlocked Debate.

External links 

 Online version of The New Testament in the Original Greek: Byzantine Textform 2005, Edited by Maurice A. Robinson and William G. Pierpont
 Comparison of the Byzantine/Majority Text with other manuscript editions on the Manuscript Comparator
 Center for Study and Preservation of the Majority Text

Bible versions and translations
Christian terminology
New Testament text-types
Textual scholarship